Alexander King Sample (born November 7, 1960) is an American prelate of the Roman Catholic Church. He has been serving as archbishop of the Archdiocese of Portland in Oregon since 2013. Sample previously served as bishop of the Diocese of Marquette in Michigan from 2005 to 2013.

Biography

Early life 
Alexander King Sample was born on November 7, 1960, in Kalispell, Montana, to Alexander and Joyce (née Dory) Sample. His father was of Scottish heritage and his mother Polish. The younger Alexander Sample graduated from Bishop Gorman High School in Las Vegas, Nevada, in 1978.  He attended Michigan Technological University (MTU) in Houghton, Michigan, where he obtained a Bachelor of Science degree in 1982 and a Master of Science degree in metallurgical engineering in 1984.

Interested in becoming a priest since the fourth grade, Sample decided to study for the priesthood after graduating from MTU, saying, "I knew I would never know peace until I explored the vocation to be a priest." He graduated in 1986 from the College of St. Thomas in St. Paul, Minnesota, and then entered the Pontifical College Josephinum in Columbus, Ohio.

Priesthood 
Sample was ordained a priest of the Diocese of Marquette by Bishop Mark Schmitt on June 1, 1990. After his ordination, Sample had the following pastoral assignments in Michigan parishes:

 Parochial vicar of St. Peter Cathedral from 1990 to 1993
 Pastor of St. George in Bark River 
 St. Michael in Perronville
 Sacred Heart in Schaffer

In 1994, Sample entered the Pontifical University of St. Thomas Aquinas (Angelicum), earning a Licentiate of Canon Law in 1996.

After returning to Marquette in 1996, Sample was named chancellor of the diocese and pastor of St. Christopher Parish in Marquette. He also served as a member of the college of consultors, as director of ministry personnel services and of ongoing formation of priests, and diocesan chaplain to the Knights of Columbus. Within the marriage tribunal, Sample served as judge, adjutant judicial vicar, defender of the bond, and promoter of justice. He was also director of the Bishop Baraga Association and vice-postulator of the cause of beatification for Bishop Frederic Baraga, a 19th century missionary to Native Americans in the Upper Midwest.

Bishop of Marquette 
On December 13, 2005, Sample was appointed the twelfth bishop of the Diocese of Marquette by Pope Benedict XVI. He received his episcopal consecration on January 25, 2006, from Cardinal Adam Maida, with Bishops James Garland and Mark Schmitt serving as co-consecrators. At the time of his consecration, Sample was the youngest Catholic bishop in the United States and the first to be born in the 1960's. He selected as his episcopal motto: "Vultum Christi contemplari", meaning "To contemplate the face of Christ".

On October 7, 2007, at the invitation of Archbishop Raymond Burke, Sample attended the Red Mass at the Cathedral Basilica of St. Louis, delivering the homily.  

In July 2012, Sample ordained five seminarians to the diaconate, and ten new subdeacons. These new subdeacons include five from the United States for the Institute of Christ the King Sovereign Priest.

Archbishop of Portland
On January 29, 2013, Sample was appointed by Pope Benedict XVI as archbishop of the Archdiocese of Portland, succeeding the retiring Archbishop John Vlazny. He was the last American residential bishop appointed during the pontificate of Benedict XVI. Sample was installed on April 2, 2013 at the Chiles Center Arena on the campus of the University of Portland.

In August 2018, Sample acknowledged the history of sexual abuse crimes committed by clergy in the archdiocese, which he described as an "institutional and spiritual" failure, and issued an apology.

In May 2018, Sample directed that Catholics attending Mass in the archdiocese must kneel after chanting the Lamb of God until they receive communion.

Viewpoints

Abortion 
In April 2009, Sample expressed his "disappointment and dismay" over the University of Notre Dame's decision to invite President Barack Obama to deliver its commencement speech and receive an honorary degree, given Obama's support of abortion. He added, It saddens me beyond words that the great university named after Our Lady would bestow distinction and honor on a politician who would seek to expand threats to such innocent human life.

Immigration 
In December 2016, at a mass celebrating the Feast of Our Lady of Guadalupe, Sample condemned racist and bigoted language used against minorities in the 2016 US Presidential Election Campaign.  He stated:It does not matter to me from where you have come, when you came, or whether you have the proper documents or not. You are loved!  You are loved by God and precious in his eyes. You are loved by Our Lady of Guadalupe. You are her special children, her little ones, and she will not abandon you.

LGBT rights 
In 2017, Sample decreed that Catholics in the archdiocese who are sexually-active LGBT, divorced or remarried in a civil ceremony should not receive the eucharist.  These individuals must first "sacramentally confess all serious sins with a firm purpose to change" before they can take communion.

Sexual abuse scandal 
In August 2018, Sample expressed his shock and disappointment over the Pennsylvanian grand jury report on sexual abuse of minors by clergy.  He stated:These horrific revelations are particularly painful in light of what victims in our own archdiocese have suffered and the impact that sexual abuse has had on the church here in western Oregon. I am sorry beyond words for the harm that has been done.

See also

 Catholic Church hierarchy
 Catholic Church in the United States
 Historical list of the Catholic bishops of the United States
 List of Catholic bishops of the United States
 Lists of patriarchs, archbishops, and bishops

References

External links
 Roman Catholic Archdiocese of Portland Official Site
 

1960 births
Living people
21st-century Roman Catholic archbishops in the United States
Roman Catholic archbishops of Portland in Oregon
Roman Catholic bishops of Marquette
Michigan Technological University alumni
University of St. Thomas (Minnesota) alumni
Pontifical College Josephinum alumni
People from Kalispell, Montana
Pontifical University of Saint Thomas Aquinas alumni
American people of Scottish descent
American people of Polish descent
Bishop Gorman High School alumni
Catholics from Montana
Catholics from Nevada